Anna Pollatou ((8 October 1983, in Kefalonia, Greece – 17 May 2014, in a car-crash near Varda, Ilia, Greece), was a Greek rhythmic gymnast. She won a bronze medal at the 2000 Summer Olympics. One year before, in 1999, Pollatou (at the age of 16) won 3 medals (a silver in the group all around and two golds in the event finals) at the World Championship in Osaka, Japan and 3 gold medals at the European Championship which took place in Budapest, Hungary.

Kefalonia's airport is named after her.

References

External links
Sports Reference

1983 births
2014 deaths
Greek rhythmic gymnasts
Olympic gymnasts of Greece
Olympic bronze medalists for Greece
Gymnasts at the 2000 Summer Olympics
Olympic medalists in gymnastics
People from Argostoli
Medalists at the 2000 Summer Olympics
Road incident deaths in Greece
Sportspeople from the Ionian Islands (region)
20th-century Greek women
21st-century Greek women